Rima Melati Sheila Adams born in Hong Kong, July 1, 1980, is a Singaporean model, actress, singer and TV personality. Most recently, she is a handbag designer.

Early and personal life 
Rima Adams was born to an Australian-Thailand father, Ronald Adams and a Singapore-Malay mother, Satifah Ali. She was a Miss Singapore Universe 2001 finalist.

Adams was first married to Davin James Cook, with whom she had a son, Edga Ian Cook.
 
Her second marriage is to Marcell Siahaan and from this she had a son named Seth Ananda Siahaan.  This marriage was criticised by the Malay-Muslim community in Singapore and Malaysia as it did not abide by the Shari’aah law because of the couple’s non-conforming decision to have a civil wedding. Shortly after their wedding, she left the Singapore entertainment industry and moved to Jakarta to be with Marcell and did not work for one year.

Career

Modeling and acting
Starting at the age of 16, Adams modeled for Diva Models from 1996 to 2002. She then joined Supermodel of the World in Singapore in 1998 and won the ‘Best Catwalk’ award. She began her acting career at MediaCorp Suria in Singapore. In 2003, Adams starred in a highly rated Suria series “E.C.” . She subsequently starred in several telemovies in Malaysia.

Cooking programs 
In Jakarta Adams became host a cooking program on Global TV, “Kitchen Beib”. By her second year in Indonesia, Rima landed her own cooking series on Trans TV, “Menjamu Tamu”.

Handbag line 
Desiring to leave the entertainment field and better position herself for the lifestyle she desired for motherhood, Adams launched a line of limited quantity, handmade bags, RIMAADAMSONLINE, which are made in Indonesia.

Television advertisements 
1998-Singtel (Singapore)
1998-Nokia (Singapore)
1999-Swensens (Singapore)
1999-Persil (Dubai)
2005-Classic Ideas (Singapore)

Television Work & Series 
1996 - Host-Hari Raya Program (Singapore)
1998 - Singing-Pesta Perdana (Singapore)
2000 - MTV ASIA-Interview (Singapore)
2002 - Rahsia Perkhawinan-Episodic, Supporting (Singapore)
2003 - E.C.-Episodic, Leading (Singapore)
2004 - Orang Minyak Kembali-Episodic, Supporting (Singapore & Malaysia)
2004 - Janji Kekasih-Episodic, Supporting (Malaysia)
2004 - Gaduh Gaduh Sayang-Episodic, Leading (Singapore & Malaysia)
2005 - Cinta Q-Episodic, Leading (Singapore)
2005 - Host Pesta Perdana (Singapore)
2006 - Singing Hari Raya-Gemilang (Singapore)
2006 - Singing Suria Raya Karnival (Singapore)
2006 - Host for Dewi Programme (Singapore)
2007 - Nona TV (Interview appearance-Malaysia)
2008 - Kpak Bing Bing (Interview - Najip Ali, Dua M Production Singapore)
2008 - Projek Cherpen-Dual, Leading (Singapore)
2008 - Satu Jam-Tele-Movie, Leading (Singapore)
2008 - Pesta, Pesta, Pesta, Hosting (Dua M Production-Singapore)
2008 - Atas Heights, Episodic, Supporting (Eaglevision Production-Singapore)
2008 - Dendam 26 Episodic, Leading (AMC Production-Malaysia)
2008 - Apa Itu Cinta-Episodic, Guest Appearance (Mariana Hashim Production-Malaysia)
2008 - Teratak Kasih Tok Mak- Tele-Movie, Supporting (Eurofine Production-Malaysia)
2008 - Kasihnya Kian Pudar, Tele-Movie, Supporting (Grand Brilliance Production-Malaysia)
2008 - Yusuf, Episodic, Guest Appearance (AMC Production-Malaysia)
2008 - Noktah Pilu, Main Cast, 26 Episode (Eurofine Production-Malaysia)
2008 - Mentadak, Guest Appearance, Tele-Movie (Eurofine Production-Malaysia)
2010-Kitchen Beib (Global TV-Indonesia)
2010-Namanya Juga Perempuan, FTV-Leading (Rumah Pohon Production-Indonesia)
2010-Golok Ciomas, FTV-Supporting (Citra Sinema Production-Indonesia)
2010–2011 Arti Sahabat Series-Supporting (Rapi Films-Indonesia)
2011–2012- Menjamu Tamu (Trans TV-Indonesia)
2012–2012- Koki Jelang Siang (Trans TV-Indonesia)
2015- Host-Hari Raya Program (Sinar Lebaran)

References 
 Tabloid Bintang 
 Detik Hot 
 Millionaires Club

External links 
 Rima Adams Online

1980 births
Singaporean television personalities
Singaporean people of Australian descent
Singaporean people of Malay descent
Living people
Indonesian female models
Singaporean women television presenters